Ba Cho (24 April 1893 – 19 July 1947) was a Burmese newspaper publisher and politician who served as the Minister of Information in Myanmar's pre-independence government. Ba Cho and six other cabinet ministers (including Prime Minister Aung San) were assassinated on 19 July 1947 in Yangon. July 19 is commemorated each year as the Martyrs' Day in Myanmar.

Ba Cho was also president of Trade Union Congress of Burma.

References

Assassinated Burmese politicians
1893 births
1947 deaths
University of Yangon alumni
Anti-Fascist People's Freedom League politicians
People from Ayeyarwady Region
People murdered in Myanmar
Government ministers of Myanmar
Deaths by firearm in Myanmar